Odense Fjord is a 13 km long fjord on the northern part of the Danish island of Funen.

It covers an area of about 63 km2.

Geography 
The city of Odense is connected with the fjord through the Odense Canal. The Odense River ends in the fjord at Stige and Seden.

The main islands in the fjord are Vigelsø (133,7 ha) and Tornø (21 ha).

See also 
 Odense
 Nakskov Fjord

References 

                                                                                                                                  

Fjords of Denmark
Tourist attractions in the Region of Southern Denmark
Geography of Funen
Geography of Odense